The Town of Hayden is a home rule municipality located in Routt County, Colorado, United States. The town population was 1,941 at the 2020 United States Census. Hayden is a part of the Steamboat Springs, CO Micropolitan Statistical Area. The town sits along U.S. Highway 40 in the Yampa River Valley between Craig and  Steamboat Springs. Hayden is located near the Yampa Valley Regional Airport, by which Hayden is one of the smallest communities in the U.S. to have mainline passenger jet service provided by American Airlines, Delta Air Lines, Southwest Airlines and United Airlines on a scheduled basis.

History 
The Ute people used the area for summer hunting before the town was settled. Trappers worked in the area in the early 1800s.

The area was first settled in 1875, with the town established in 1894 and incorporated in 1906. Hayden was named for F.V. Hayden, head of a survey party for the U.S. Geological & Geographic Survey in the late 1860s. Hayden explored western Colorado during the late nineteenth century.

The Denver and Salt Lake Railway reached Hayden by 1916, and the rail line continues on today as part of the Union Pacific Railroad.

Historically a center of coal mining and agriculture, it consists today of a small cluster of homes and businesses.

Geography
Hayden is located at  (40.492731, -107.255186).

Climate
The Town of Hayden has a Humid continental climate (Köppen climate classification Dfb), with warm summers, cold winters with heavy snow, and equal precipitation year-round. The frost-free growing season is short, averaging 107 days.

Demographics

As of the census of 2000, there were 1,634 people, 618 households, and 443 families residing in the town. The racial makeup of the town was 96.02% White, 0.12% African American, 0.61% Native American, 0.12% Asian, 0.06% Pacific Islander, 1.96% from other races, and 1.10% from two or more races. Hispanic or Latino of any race were 5.69% of the population.

There were 618 households, out of which 42.1% had children under the age of 18 living with them, 57.1% were married couples living together, 9.4% had a female householder with no husband present, and 28.2% were non-families. 21.7% of all households were made up of individuals, and 5.5% had someone living alone who was 65 years of age or older.  The average household size was 2.63 and the average family size was 3.08.

In the town, the population was spread out, with 30.3% under the age of 18, 9.5% from 18 to 24, 33.1% from 25 to 44, 20.9% from 45 to 64, and 6.1% who were 65 years of age or older.  The median age was 32 years. For every 100 females, there were 104.5 males.  For every 100 females age 18 and over, there were 100.2 males.

The median income for a household in the town was $42,147, and the median income for a family was $45,962. Males had a median income of $38,150 versus $23,359 for females. The per capita income for the town was $18,574.  About 5.4% of families and 7.0% of the population were below the poverty line, including 8.2% of those under age 18 and 7.4% of those age 65 or over.

Notable people
 Earl Bascom (1906-1995) - Hollywood actor, artist, sculptor, inventor, rodeo pioneer who lived and cowboyed in Hayden in the 1930s.
 Frank Tenney Johnson (1874-1939) - painter of the Old American West, known for his "moonlight painting" technique, who worked on the Lazy 7 Ranch of Hayden.

See also

Colorado
Bibliography of Colorado
Index of Colorado-related articles
Outline of Colorado
List of counties in Colorado
List of municipalities in Colorado
List of places in Colorado
List of statistical areas in Colorado
Steamboat Springs-Craig, CO Combined Statistical Area
Steamboat Springs, CO Micropolitan Statistical Area
Yampa River

References

External links

Town of Hayden website
CDOT map of the Town of Hayden

Towns in Routt County, Colorado
Towns in Colorado
Populated places established in 1894
1894 establishments in Colorado